Black As He's Painted (1974) is a detective novel by Ngaio Marsh, the 28th to feature Roderick Alleyn.  The plot concerns the newly independent fictional African nation of Ng'ombwana, whose president and Alleyn went to school together, and a series of murders connected to its embassy in London. The novel was written in New Zealand in the late Spring and Summer of 1973, and a year later was on the Sunday Times best-seller list in the UK, as well as proving a best-seller in the USA. Marsh's first biographer Margaret Lewis   quotes a letter Marsh wrote in March 1973: "I've gone into purdah with a new book. It's always a huge effort to get back into harness after an interval in the theatre and this time it's been uphill all the way... I've saddled myself this time with a complicated and hideously exacting mise-en-scene and am just crossing the halfway mark, full of black forebodings laced with pale streaks of hope." Dr Lewis quotes Marsh's editor at Collins, Robert Knittel, writing in September 1973: "I have just finished reading your latest novel and I think it is splendid. A real vintage Ngaio Marsh."

Synopsis
The novel is set in the 'Embassy quarter' of London's Knightsbridge and South Kensington. The fictional Baronsgate and Capricorns (Place, Square, Mews etc), designated variously as SW3 or SW7, are clearly based on Prince's and Queen's Gate, and the nearby Montpeliers where Marsh had rented homes during her frequent London stays. It is a most unusual setting and plot for a classic whodunit of the kind Ngaio Marsh wrote, and the book is accordingly memorable.

The "spinsterish" Sam Whipplestone retires from the Foreign Office and buys on a whim a charming little house at No 1 Capricorn Mews, not far from Palace Park Gardens where a palatial Georgian mansion now houses the Embassy of Ng'ombwana, a newly independent African republic, where Mr Whipplestone had lived for some years, and, speaking the language, is held to be something of an FO expert. (Alleyn admits in discussion that there is an anomaly in the new republic having an embassy rather than a High Commission, while remaining within the British Commonwealth, an arrangement apparently insisted upon by the new president.) Mr Whipplestone buys the property from a Mr Sheridan, who remains as tenant of the basement flat, and acquires the services of Mr & Mrs Chubb, resident on the top floor, to cook and clean for him. He also adopts an abused stray cat he names Lucy Lockett, who plays a central role in the story. (Marsh, like fellow crime writer, Dorothy L Sayers, was a great cat lover.)

The Ng'ombwanan president, Bartholomew Opala, an impressive and formidable former barrister, educated at "an illustrious public school", where his best friend was Roderick Alleyn and he was nicknamed 'The Boomer', is to make a state visit to London, and the Special Branch, alarmed about the security aspects, send Alleyn out to Ng'ombwana beforehand to use the "old school tie" to try to persuade the notoriously unco-operative president, a sitting target for various disaffected groups, to comply with agreed security arrangements. In the event, at a major reception in the London Embassy, an attempt is made on the President's life, but it is the Ambassador, sitting beside him, who is fatally skewered by an African spear... on Ng'ombwawan diplomatic premises, which complicates the ensuing investigation, apart from the fact that Alleyn's wife Agatha Troy is painting a portrait of 'The Boomer', which she senses will be the magnum opus of her illustrious career.

Meanwhile, the Capricorns are home to an assorted cast of suspects, with Ng'ombwanan connections, every reason to seek a change of régime, most of whom attended the fatal Embassy reception, including some deeply unpleasant racists, who seem to be meeting in the basement flat at No 1 to concoct a conspiracy against the régime. These include: Mr Whipplestone's mysterious tenant, his domestic couple (whose only daughter was raped and murdered by a Ng'ombwanan who was not brought to justice), a boozy colonel (formerly Head of the Ng'ombwanan Army) and his gin-soaked wife, and an obese and grotesquely attired brother and sister, formerly wealthy business owners in Ng'ombwana, now running a small pig-pottery in the Capricorns ("K & X Sanskrit: Pigs"). The investigation, headed by Alleyn, his usual Scotland Yard support team (Fox, Bailey and Thompson) and his Special Branch colleague Fred Gibson, concentrates on these dubious characters and their hatred of the President and his new régime.

References

Roderick Alleyn novels
1974 British novels
Novels set in London
Collins Crime Club books